Padangbai is a small coastal town in eastern Bali, Indonesia near Candidasa. It serves as a ferry port for travel to Lembar on Lombok, The Gilis and other of the Lesser Sunda Islands.

Notable places

Beaches
Four beaches are located at Padangbai:

 Main Beach
 Blue Lagoon Beach (also known as Padang Kurungan)
 Bias Tugal Beach (also known as Pantai Kecil, Little Beach, or White Sand Beach)
 Mimba Beach (also known as Black Pearl Sand Beach)

Temples
The following temples are located at Padangbai:

 Pura Silayukti
 Pura Penataran Agung
 Pura Dalem
 Pura Segara
 Pura Puseh
 Pura Pesamuhan
 Pura Telaga Mas
 Pura Tanjung Sari

Gallery

External links

 Padangbai page from Geko Dive Bali

Populated places in Bali